Sutikno (born March 23, 1985) is an Indonesian footballer that currently plays for Pusamania Borneo F.C.

References

External links
 

1985 births
Association football defenders
Association football midfielders
Living people
Indonesian footballers
Liga 1 (Indonesia) players
Arema F.C. players
Deltras F.C. players
Persiba Balikpapan players
Persitara Jakarta Utara players
Indonesian Premier Division players
Mitra Kukar players
Borneo F.C. players